Iain Stewart (born 23 October 1969) is a Scottish former football player and manager.

References

Sources
 

1969 births
Living people
Footballers from Dundee
Association football forwards
Scottish footballers
Dundee F.C. players
Lossiemouth F.C. players
Inverness Caledonian Thistle F.C. players
Peterhead F.C. players
Scottish Football League players
Scottish football managers
Peterhead F.C. managers
Scottish Football League managers